Cost estimation in software engineering is typically concerned with the financial spend on the effort to develop and test the software, this can also include requirements review, maintenance, training, managing and buying extra equipment, servers and software. Many methods have been developed for estimating software costs for a given project.

Methods 
Methods for estimation in software engineering include these principles:
Analysis effort method
Parametric Estimating
The Planning Game (from Extreme Programming)
ITK method, also known as Method CETIN
Proxy-based estimating (PROBE) (from the Personal Software Process)
Program Evaluation and Review Technique (PERT)
Putnam model, also known as SLIM
PRICE Systems Founders of Commercial Parametric models that estimates the scope, cost, effort and schedule for software projects.
SEER-SEM Parametric Estimation of Effort, Schedule, Cost, Risk.  Minimum time and staffing concepts based on Brooks's law
The Use Case Points method (UCP)
Weighted Micro Function Points (WMFP)
Wideband Delphi

Most cost software development estimation techniques involve estimating or measuring software size first and then applying some knowledge of historical of cost per unit of size.  Software size is typically sized in SLOC, Function Point or Agile story points.

See also
 Software development effort estimation
 Software metric
 Project management
 Cost overrun
 Risk
 Comparison of development estimation software

External links
 Software Estimation chapter from O'Reilly, Applied Software Project Management
 Estimating With Use Case Points from Methods & Tools
 Definition of Use Case Points method (UCP)
 Roy K. Clemmons, Project Estimation With Use Case Points
 Estimating techniques throughout the SDLC